Brian Best is a South African rugby league footballer who represented South Africa national rugby league team in the 2000 World Cup.

References

Living people
South African rugby league players
South Africa national rugby league team players
Rugby league fullbacks
Rugby league wingers
Year of birth missing (living people)